OAO, a three-letter acronym, may stand for:
Orbiting Astronomical Observatory, the name of four NASA scientific satellites
Open joint-stock company, business incorporation in Russia, Ukraine etc.
Odessey and Oracle, 1968 album by The Zombies
Oddworld: Abe's Oddysee a platform game made by Oddworld Inhabitants released in 1997
Over and Out (disambiguation), various meanings including the usual ending of transmissions in telecommunications
Open-access operator, a British passenger rail company which does not hold a franchise